Paddy Doherty (born 1934) is a former Irish sportsperson. Born in Ballykinlar, County Down, he played Gaelic football with his local club Ballykinlar and was a member of the Down senior inter-county team from the 1950s until the 1960s.  Doherty captained Down to the All-Ireland title in 1961.

Honours
 7 Ulster Senior Football Championships (1959 1960 1961 1963 1965 1966 1968)
 3 All-Ireland Senior Football Championships (1960 1961 1968)
 3 National Football League Division 1s (1960 1962 1968)
 3 Down Junior Football Championships (1936 1941 1945)
 2 Down Division 1 Football Leagues (1961 1962)

References

 

1934 births
Living people
All-Ireland-winning captains (football)
Ballykinlar Gaelic footballers
Down inter-county Gaelic footballers
Ulster inter-provincial Gaelic footballers